The Flowers Hills are a triangular shaped group of hills,  long and  wide, with peaks of  (Gubesh Peak) and  (Dickey Peak), extending along the eastern edge of the Sentinel Range, Ellsworth Mountains, Antarctica. The hills are bounded by Hansen Glacier and Dater Glacier to the west and north, Rutford Ice Stream to the east and Sikera Valley to the southwest, and separated from Doyran Heights to the west-southwest by Kostinbrod Pass.  Their interior is drained by Lardeya Ice Piedmont and Valoga Glacier.

The hills were first mapped by the United States Geological Survey from surveys and U.S. Navy air photos, 1957–59, and were named by the Advisory Committee on Antarctic Names for Edwin C. Flowers, a meteorologist at the South Pole Station in 1957.

Maps
 Vinson Massif.  Scale 1:250 000 topographic map.  Reston, Virginia: US Geological Survey, 1988.
 Antarctic Digital Database (ADD). Scale 1:250000 topographic map of Antarctica. Scientific Committee on Antarctic Research (SCAR). Since 1993, regularly updated.

Features
Geographical features include:

 Batil Spur
 Dater Glacier
 Dickey Peak
 Gubesh Peak
 Hansen Glacier
 Kostinbrod Pass
 Lardeya Ice Piedmont
 Monyak Hill
 Rutford Ice Stream
 Sikera Valley
 Strinava Glacier
 Taylor Spur
 Valoga Glacier

References

External links
 Flowers Hills. Adjusted Copernix satellite image

Hills of Ellsworth Land